Mount Rainey is a  summit located in the Coast Mountains of British Columbia, Canada. The nearest higher neighbor is Mount Magee,  to the east-northeast. This mountain's toponym was officially adopted 4 May 1926 on Geological Survey sheet 193A, and confirmed by the Geographical Names Board of Canada in 1953 to remember Robert "Bob" Rainey, the first locator on this mountain who was killed on his mineral claim near Stewart. Precipitation runoff from the mountain drains into the Portland Canal.

Climate

Based on the Köppen climate classification, Mount Rainey is located in a subarctic climate zone of western North America. Most weather fronts originate in the Pacific Ocean, and travel east toward the Coast Mountains where they are forced upward by the range (Orographic lift), causing them to drop their moisture in the form of rain or snowfall. As a result, the Coast Mountains experience high precipitation, especially during the winter months in the form of snowfall. Temperatures can drop below −20 °C with wind chill factors below −30 °C.

Gallery

See also
 Otter Mountain

References

External links
 Weather forecast: Mount Rainey

One-thousanders of British Columbia
Pacific Ranges
Stewart Country
Boundary Ranges